Onychocerus giesberti is a species of beetle in the family Cerambycidae. It was described by Júlio and Monné in 2001.

References

Anisocerini
Beetles described in 2001